Reading Green Park may refer to:

 Green Park Business Park, a business park in Reading, England
 Green Park Village, a proposed village in Reading, England
 Reading Green Park railway station, the railway station serving the park